Tuğba Taşçı (born 19 August 1984) is a Turkish professional basketball player, formally of Kayseri Kaski.

See also
 Turkish women in sports

References

External links
Profile at tbl.org.tr

1984 births
Living people
Abdullah Gül Üniversitesi basketball players
Beşiktaş women's basketball players
Galatasaray S.K. (women's basketball) players
Migrosspor basketball players
Shooting guards
Basketball players from Istanbul
Turkish women's basketball players